Frank Harlan Freedman (December 15, 1924 – August 21, 2003) was a United States district judge of the United States District Court for the District of Massachusetts.

Education and career

Born in Springfield, Massachusetts, Freedman was a lieutenant in the United States Navy during World War II, from 1943 to 1946. He received a Bachelor of Laws from Boston University School of Law in 1949, and a Master of Laws from that school in 1950. He was in private practice in Springfield from 1950 to 1968, and served on the Springfield City Council from 1960 to 1967. He was an assistant state attorney general of Massachusetts and Chief of the Springfield Office from 1963 to 1967. He was the Mayor of Springfield from 1968 to 1972, having won the 1967, 1969, and 1971 mayoral races.

Federal judicial service

On August 14, 1972, Freedman was nominated by President Richard Nixon to a seat on the United States District Court for the District of Massachusetts vacated by Judge Levin H. Campbell. Freedman was confirmed by the United States Senate on October 12, 1972, and received his commission on October 17, 1972. He served as Chief Judge from 1986 to 1992, assuming senior status on January 1, 1992, and serving in that capacity until his death on August 21, 2003, in Springfield.

See also
 List of Jewish American jurists

References

Sources
 

1924 births
2003 deaths
Boston University School of Law alumni
Judges of the United States District Court for the District of Massachusetts
United States district court judges appointed by Richard Nixon
20th-century American judges
Mayors of Springfield, Massachusetts
Springfield, Massachusetts City Council members
Military personnel from Massachusetts
United States Navy officers
People from Springfield, Massachusetts
Judges of the United States Foreign Intelligence Surveillance Court
Connecticut Republicans